Richard Armstrong  (1815 – 26 August 1880) was an Irish Liberal politician, and barrister.

He was the son of William Armstrong, an engineer by profession, of Roxborough, Co. Armagh, and his wife Eliza Armstrong (née Steacy).

After graduating in law from Trinity College Dublin, Armstrong was called to the bar in 1839 and then, in 1854, became Queen's Counsel.

He was considered one of the finest Irish advocates of his time, with numerous courtroom triumphs to his credit, most notably the Yelverton case.

Armstrong was elected MP as a Liberal candidate for Sligo Borough in the 1865 general election and held the seat until 1868 when he stood down.

He was the First Serjeant-at-law of Ireland from 1866 until his death, having previously served as Third Serjeant from 1861 to 1865, and briefly as Second Serjeant in 1865. A very tall man, he was nicknamed "the Big Serjeant" while his diminutive colleague Sir Edward Sullivan, 1st Baronet was "the Little Serjeant".

Armstrong married Elizabeth Meurant in 1847, and they had at least one son, William Armstrong BL (1848-1899) who married Alice Arundel, and one daughter, Lily (1952-1931) who befriended John Ruskin while she attended Winnington Hall. She was the subject of a watercolour by him, and was a lily in his book Lilies and Sesame: the Ethics of Dust. Lily married Lt. William T. S. Kevill-Davies.

References

External links
 

1815 births
1880 deaths
Irish Liberal Party MPs
UK MPs 1865–1868
Serjeants-at-law (Ireland)
Alumni of Trinity College Dublin
Irish Queen's Counsel
19th-century King's Counsel
People from County Armagh
Members of the Parliament of the United Kingdom for County Sligo constituencies (1801–1922)